The National Convention was the constituent assembly of the Kingdom of France for one day and the French First Republic for the rest of its existence during the French Revolution, following the two-year National Constituent Assembly and the one-year Legislative Assembly. Created after the great insurrection of 10 August 1792, it was the first French government organized as a republic, abandoning the monarchy altogether. The Convention sat as a single-chamber assembly from 20 September 1792 to 26 October 1795 (4 Brumaire IV under the Convention's adopted calendar).

The Convention came about when the Legislative Assembly decreed the provisional suspension of King Louis XVI and the convocation of a National Convention to draw up a new constitution with no monarchy.  The other major innovation was to decree that deputies to that Convention should be elected by all Frenchmen twenty-one years old or more, domiciled for a year and living by the product of their labor. The National Convention was, therefore, the first French assembly elected by a suffrage without distinctions of class.

Although the Convention lasted until 1795, power was effectively delegated by the Convention and concentrated in the small Committee of Public Safety from April 1793. The eight months from the fall of 1793 to the spring of 1794, when Maximilien Robespierre and his allies dominated the Committee of Public Safety, represent the most radical and bloodiest phase of the French Revolution, known as the Reign of Terror. After the fall of Robespierre, the Convention lasted for another year until a new constitution was written, ushering in the French Directory.

Elections 
The indirect election took place from 2 to 10 September 1792 after the election of the electoral colleges by primary assemblies on 26 August. Despite the introduction of universal male suffrage, the turn-out was low, though the election saw an increase in comparison to the 1791 electionsin 1792 11.9% of a greatly increased electorate votes, compared to 10.2% of a much smaller electorate in the 1791.
The low turn-out was partly due to a fear of victimization; in Paris, Robespierre presided over the elections and, in concert with the radical press, managed to exclude any candidate of royalist sympathies. In the whole of France, only eleven primary assemblies wanted to retain the monarchy. The electoral assemblies all tacitly voted for a "republic", though only Paris used that word. The elections returned the same sort of men that the active citizens had chosen in 1791.

On 20 September the Convention held its first session in the "Salle des Cent-Suisses", the next day it moved to the Salle du Manège, which had little room for the public and bad acoustics. From 10 May 1793 it met in the Salle des Machines, an immense hall in which the deputies were loosely scattered. The Salle des Machines had galleries for the public who often influenced the debates with interruptions or applause. 

The members of the Convention came from all classes of society, but the most numerous were lawyers. 75 members had sat in the National Constituent Assembly, 183 in the Legislative Assembly. The full number of deputies was 749, not counting 33 from the French colonies, of whom only some arrived in Paris in time. Thomas Paine and Anacharsis Cloots were appointed in the Convention by Girondins. Besides these, however, the newly formed  annexed to France from 1782 to 1789 were allowed to send deputations.

According to its own ruling, the Convention elected its President every fortnight, and the outgoing President was eligible for re-election after the lapse of a fortnight. Ordinarily, the sessions were held in the morning, but evening sessions also occurred frequently, often extending late into the night. Sometimes in exceptional circumstances, the Convention declared itself in permanent session and sat for several days without interruption. For both legislative and administrative the Convention used committees, with powers more or less widely extended and regulated by successive laws. The most famous of these committees included the Committee of Public Safety and the Committee of General Security.

The Convention held legislative and executive powers during the first years of the French First Republic and had three distinct periods: Girondin, Montagnard or Jacobin, and Thermidorian.

Political Breakdown 
The National Convention was made up of three major factions. The Mountain or the Montagnards, The Plain or the Marais and The Girondins or the Brissotins. Historians are divided on the exact make up of the Convention but the current consensus is that the Mountain was the biggest faction with around 302-309 deputies. The Girondins were represented by 178-227 deputies and the Plain was represented by 153-250 deputies. Of the three groups the Mountain was the most cohesive and The Plain was the least cohesive. Over 94% of the Mountain voted similarly on core issues, comparatively the Girondins and The Plain were much more divided with only 70% of Girondins voting similarly on the same issues and only 58% of The Plain voting similarly on the same issues.

Girondin Convention 
The first session was held on 20 September 1792. The following day, the assembly agreed to the proposition "That royalty be abolished in France" and was carried with cheers. On the 22nd came the news of the Battle of Valmy. On the same day, it was decreed that "in future the acts of the assembly shall be dated First Year of the French Republic". Three days later, the corollary that "the French republic is one and indivisible" was added to guard against federalism. A republic had been proclaimed but remained to enact a republican government. The country was little more republican in feeling or practice than it had been before at any time since Varennes but now had to become a republic because it no longer had a king.

When the Convention met the military situation was undergoing an extraordinary transformation that seemed to confirm the Girondin prophecies of easy victory. After Valmy, the Prussians withdrew to the frontier, and in November, French troops occupied the left bank of the Rhine. The Austrians, who had besieged Lille in October, were defeated by Dumouriez at the Battle of Jemappes on 6 November and evacuated the Austrian Netherlands. Nice was occupied and Savoy proclaimed its union with France. The successes made it safe to quarrel at home.

Girondins and Montagnards

Most historians divide the National Convention into two main factions: the Girondins and the Montagnards. The Girondins were more conservative than the Montagnards though they were still democrats. The Girondins drew their name from the Gironde, a region of France from which many of the deputies of this faction were elected (although many "Girondins" were actually Parisian by origin) and were also known as the Brissotins after their most prominent speaker, Jacques Pierre Brissot.

The Montagnards, drew their support from the Paris Commune and the popular societies such as the Jacobin Club and the Cordeliers, they got their name from the high bleachers on which they sat while the Convention was in session.

Three questions dominated the first months of the Convention, revolutionary violence, the trial of the king and the Parisian dominance of politics.

Antagonism between Paris and the provinces created friction among the people that served as a propaganda tool and combat weapon for the two groups. The departments resisted the idea of centralisation. They saw the idea being symbolised by the desire to reduce the capital of the Revolution to a minuscule share of influence. Much of the Gironde wished to remove the Assembly from a city dominated by "agitators and flatterers of the people" but did not yet encourage an aggressive federalism, which would have run counter to its political ambitions.

The Plain 

The Plain was a third faction during the Convention. Some historians consider these men to be closely associated with the Girondins, but the Plain was much more centrist in its ideals. It derived its name from their place on the floor of the Convention. During the start of the Convention, they sided with the Girondins, however, as it progressed and the Montagnards began to push for the execution of Louis, the Plain began to side with them.

Trial and execution of king

The Convention's unanimous declaration of a French Republic on 21 September 1792 left open the fate of the former king. A commission was therefore established to examine the evidence against him while the Convention's Legislation Committee considered legal aspects of any future trial. Most Montagnards favoured judgment and execution, but the Girondins were divided concerning Louis's fate, with some arguing for royal inviolability, others supporting clemency and still others advocating lesser punishment or banishment. On 13 November, Robespierre stated in the Convention that a Constitution which Louis had violated himself, despite declaring his inviolability, could not be used in his defence. Robespierre had been taken ill and had done little other than support Saint-Just, who gave his first major speech, in his argument against the king's inviolability. On 20 November, opinion turned sharply against Louis following the discovery of a secret cache of 726 documents consisting of Louis's personal communications with bankers and ministers. At his trial, he claimed not to recognise documents that had been clearly signed by himself.

The trial began on 10 December. The Montagnards put the debate on the ideological level. Louis XVI was classified as an enemy, who was alien to the body of the nation and as a "usurper". Balloting began on 15 January 1793. Each deputy explained his vote at the rostrum. The vote against the king was unanimous. There was to be no popular referendum, as Girondins had hoped. The fatal vote started on 16 January and continued until the next day. Of the 726 deputies present, 361 declared themselves for the death penalty without condition, 26 voted for death on condition that the Mailhe amendment be applied, 334 were opposed (incl. 44 who voted for death with reprieve), 5 abstained or recused. On 19 January, the question of reprieve was put to a vote: 380 votes were cast against and 310 for (2 voted on condition, 10 abstained or recused). Each time, the Girondins had split.

On the morning of 21 January, the Convention ordered the entire National Guard to line both sides of the route to the scaffold. Louis was beheaded at the Place de la Revolution. Within the nation, "voters" and "appellants", those against or for the execution of Louis, swore undying hatred of each other. The rest of Europe, fearing the outcome of the French Revolution in their own countries, decreed a war of extermination against regicides.

Crisis and fall of Girondins 
The Assembly began harmoniously, but within a few days the Girondins launched a bitter attack on their Montagnard opponents. Conflict continued without interruption until the expulsion of the Girondin leaders from the Convention on 2 June 1793. The Girondins had relied on votes from the majority of the deputies, many of whom were alarmed as well as scandalized by the September massacres, but their insistence on monopolising all positions of authority during the Convention, and their attacks on the Montagnard leaders, soon irritated them and causiled them to regard the party as a faction.

Girondins were convinced that their opponents aspired to a bloody dictatorship, but the Montagnards believed that the Girondins were ready for any compromise with conservatives and even royalists to guarantee their remaining in power. The bitter enmity soon reduced the Convention to a state of limbo. Debate after debate degenerated into verbal brawling from which no decision could emerge. The political deadlock, which had repercussions all over France, eventually drove men to accept dangerous allies: royalists in the case of Girondins, sans-culottes in that of the Montagnards.

[[File:La chute des Girondins.jpg|thumb|right|250px|Fall of the Girondins]]
Thus, the struggle within the Convention continued without results. The decision was to come from outside. Since the king's trial, the sans-culottes had been constantly assailing the "appealers" (appelants), quickly came to desire their expulsion from the Convention and demanded the establishing a Revolutionary Tribunal to deal with supposed aristocratic plots. Military setbacks from the First Coalition, Charles François Dumouriez's defection to the enemy and the war in the Vendée, which began in March 1793, were all used as arguments by Montagnards and sans-culottes to portray Girondins as soft. The Montagnard proposed measures, but the Girondins were reluctant take such measures. The Girondins were forced to accept the Montagnards' creation of the Revolutionary Tribunal and a Committee of Public Safety. Social and economic difficulties exacerbated the tensions between the groups.

The final showdown was precipitated by Jean-Paul Marat's trial and the arrest of sectional activists. On 25 May, the Paris Commune marched to the Convention to demand the release of the activists. In reply, Maximin Isnard, who was presiding over the Convention, launched into a diatribe reminiscent of the Brunswick Manifesto: "If any attack made on the persons of the representatives of the nation, then I declare to you in the name of the whole country that Paris would be destroyed". On the next day, the Jacobins declared themselves in a state of insurrection. On 28 May, the Cité section called the other sections to a meeting in order to organize the insurrection. On 29 May, the delegates representing 33 of the sections formed an insurrectionary committee of nine members. On 2 June, 80,000 armed sans-culottes surrounded the Convention. After an attempt of deputies to leave was stopped with guns, the deputies resigned themselves to declare the arrest of 29 leading Girondins. In that way, the Gironde ceased to be a political force.

 Montagnard Convention 

Scarcely had the Gironde been eliminated when the Convention, now under Montagnard leadership, found itself caught between two threats. While the federalist revolt gained strength, the popular movement, roused to fury by high prices, was increasing the pressure it exercised on the government. Meanwhile, the Government was proving incapable of controlling the situation. In July 1793, the nation appeared to be on the point of falling apart.

 Constitution of 1793 

In June the Montagnards played for time, yet the Convention did not overlook the peasants. It was to them that the revolution of 31 May (like those of 14 July and 10 August) brought a substantial benefit. On 3 June the sale of the property of emigrants, in small parcels and payable in ten years, was decreed; on the 10th, the optional division of common lands by head; and on 17 July, the abolition, without compensation, of all that remained of manorial rights.

The Montagnards attempted to reassure the middle classes by rejecting any idea of terror, by protecting property rights and by restricting the popular movement to very narrowly-circumscribed limits. It was a delicate balance to achieve, a balance that was destroyed in July by the worsening of the crisis. The Convention rapidly approved the new constitution in the hope to clear itself of the charge of dictatorship and calm the anxieties of the departments.

The Declaration of Rights, which precedes the text of the Constitution, solemnly reaffirmed the nation's indivisibility and the great principles of freedom of the press, equality and resistance to oppression. It went far beyond the Declaration of 1789, adding to it the right to public assistance, work, education and insurrection. No man could impose his will on others. All political and social tyranny was abolished. Although the Montagnards had refused to be led further down the road to democracy, the Constitution became the bible of all democrats.

The chief aim of the Constitution was to ensure the major role of the deputies in the Convention, which was seen as being the essential basis for political democracy. The Legislative Assembly was to be elected by direct vote cast for a single member, deputies were elected on receiving a simple majority of the votes cast, and the assembly would sit for one year. The executive council of 24 members was chosen by the Legislative Assembly from among the 83 candidates chosen by the departments on the basis of universal male suffrage, and in that way, ministers were made responsible to the representatives of the nation. The exercise of national sovereignty was widened through the institution of the referendum. The Constitution was to be ratified by the people, as were laws in certain precisely defined circumstances.

The Constitution was submitted for popular ratification and adopted by a huge margin of more than 1,801,918 in favour to some 17,610 against. The results of the plebiscite were made public on 10 August 1793, but the application of the Constitution, the text of which was placed in the sacred ark and laid in the debating-chamber of the Convention, was postponed until peace had been made.

 Federalist revolt and war 

Indeed, the Montagnards faced dramatic circumstances: federalist insurrection, war in the Vendée, military failures and a worsening economic situation. Despite everything, a new civil war could not be avoided. By the middle of June, about 60 departments were in more or less open rebellion. However, the frontier departments had remained faithful to the Convention. The rising was widespread, rather than deep. It was essentially the work of the departmental and district administrations. The communes, which were more popular in composition, showed themselves in general lukewarm or hostile, and federalist leaders soon became divided among themselves. Sincere republicans among them could not fail to be uneasy about the foreign invasion and the Vendée. Those who were seeing themselves rejected by the people sought support from the moderates, the Feuillants and even the aristocrats.

July and August were bad months on the frontiers. Within three weeks Mainz, the symbol of previous successes, capitulated to the Prussians, and the Austrians captured the fortresses of Condé and Valenciennes and invaded northern France. Spanish troops crossed the Pyrenees and began advancing on Perpignan. The Piedmontese took advantage of the diversion of republican forces at Lyons in order to invade France from the East. In Corsica, Paoli's revolt expelled the French from the island with British support. British troops opened the siege of Dunkirk in August, and in October, the Allies invaded Alsace. The military situation had become desperate.

In addition were other incidents that compounded the fury of the revolutionaries and convinced them that their opponents had abandoned all restraint of civilized behavior. On 13 July, Charlotte Corday murdered the sans-culotte idol Jean-Paul Marat. She had been in touch with Girondin rebels in Normandy, and they were believed to have used her as their agent.

The lack of forethought displayed by the Convention during the first few days was redeemed by its vigor and skill in organizing measures of repression. Warrants were issued for the arrest of the rebellious Girondin leaders. The members of the revolting departmental administration were deprived of their office.

The regions in which the revolt was dangerous were precisely those in which a large number of royalists had remained. There was no room for a third party between the Mountain, which was identified with the Republic, and royalism, which was the ally of the enemy. The royalist insurrection in the Vendée had already led the Convention to take a long step in the direction of the Terror: that is to say, the dictatorship of central power and the suppression of liberties. The Girondin insurrection now prompted it to take a decisive step in the same direction.

 Revolutionary government 

The Constituent Assembly had legislated through its commissions. The Convention governed by means of its committees. Two of them were of essential importance: Public Safety and General Security. The second, which had formidable powers, is less well known than the first, which was the true executive authority and was armed with immense prerogatives. It dated from April, but its composition was thoroughly reshuffled during the summer of 1793.

The summer of 1793 saw sans-culotte disturbances reach a peak under a double banner: price fixing and terror. On top came the news of unprecedented treason: Toulon and its squadron had been handed over to the enemy. In the name of the wretched poverty of the people, the leaders of the enragés, with Jacques Roux at their head, called for a planned economy from a Convention, which had no liking for the idea. However, the revolutionary logic of the mobilization of resources by national dictatorship was infinitely more powerful than economic doctrine. In August, a series of decrees gave the authorities discretionary powers over the production and circulation of grain and ferocious punishments for fraud. "Granaries of plenty" were prepared, to stock corn requisitioned by authorities in each district. On 23 August, the decree on the levée en masse turned able-bodied civilians into soldiers.

On 5 September, Parisians tried to repeat the revolt of 2 June. Armed sections again encircled the Convention to demand the setting up of an internal revolutionary army, the arrest of suspects and a purge of the committees. It was probably the key day in the formation of the revolutionary government: the convention yielded, but kept control of events. It put Terror on the agenda on 5 September, on the 6th elected Collot d'Herbois and Billaud-Varenne to the Committee of Public Safety, on the 9th created the revolutionary army, on the 11th decreed the Maximum for grain and fodder (general controls for prices, and wages on the 29th), on the 14th reorganized the Revolutionary Tribunal, on the 17th voted in the law on suspects, and on the 20th gave the local revolutionary committees the task of drawing up lists of them.

The dictatorship of the Convention and the committees, simultaneously supported and controlled by the Parisian sections, representing the sovereign people in permanent session, lasted from June to September. It governed through a network of institutions set up haphazardly since spring in March, the Revolutionary Tribunal and representatives on missions in the departments and was followed the next month by the Convention's representatives to the armies, also armed with unlimited powers; and enforced acceptance of assignat as the sole legal tender, price controls for grain and the forced loan of a billion livres from the rich.

At last, France saw a government take shape. Danton resigned from it on 10 July. Couthon, Saint-Just, Jeanbon Saint-Andre, and Prieur of the Marne formed a nucleus of resolute Montagnards who rallied Barère and Lindet, then successfully added Robespierre on 27 July, Carnot and Prieur of Cote-d'Ore on 14 August, and Collot d'Herbois and Billaud-Varenne on 6 September. They had a few clear ideas to which they clung: to command, to fight, and to conquer. Their work in common, the danger, the taste of and pride in power created solidarity that made the Committee an autonomous organism.

The committee was always managed collegially, despite the specific nature of the tasks of each director: the division into "politicians" and "technicians" was a Thermidorian invention, intended to lay the corpses of the Terror at the door of the Robespierrists alone. Many things, however, set the twelve committee members at loggerheads; Barère was more a man of the Convention than of the committee and was a link with the Plaine. Robert Lindet had qualms about the Terror which, by contrast, was the outstanding theme of Collot d'Herbois and Billaud-Varenne, latecomers to the committee, forced on it by the sans-culottes in September; unlike Robespierre and his friends, Lazare Carnot had given his support only provisionally and for reasons of state to a policy concession to the people. But the situation which united them in the summer of 1793 was stronger than those differences of opinion. The Committee had to set itself above all, and choose those popular demands which were most suitable for achieving the Assembly's aims: to crush the enemies of the Republic and dash the last hopes of the aristocracy. To govern in the name of the Convention, at the same time controlling it, and to restrain the people without quenching their enthusiasm—this was a gamble.

The ensemble of institutions, measures and procedures which constituted it was codified in a decree of 14 Frimaire (4 December) which set the seal on what had been the gradual development of centralized dictatorship founded on the Terror. In the center was the Convention, whose secular arm was the Committee of Public Safety, vested with immense powers: it interpreted the Convention's decrees and settled their methods of application; under its immediate authority it had all state bodies and all civil servants (even ministers would disappear in April 1794); it directed military and diplomatic activity, appointed generals and members of other committees, subject to ratification by the Convention. It held responsibility for conducting war, public order and the provisioning of the population. The Commune of Paris, a famous sans-culotte bastion, was neutralized by coming under its control.

Economy
Administrative and economic centralization went hand in hand. The state of siege forced France into autarky; to save the Republic the government mobilized all the nation's productive forces and reluctantly accepted the need for a controlled economy, which it introduced extemporaneously, as the emergency required. It was necessary to develop war production, revive foreign trade, and find new resources in France itself, and time was short. Circumstances gradually compelled it to assume the economic government of the country. Along with organization of the army, this was the most original feature of its work.

All material resources were subjected to requisitioning. Farmers surrendered their grain, fodder, wool, flax, and hemp. Artisans and merchants gave up their manufactured products. Raw materials were carefully sought out: metal of all kinds, church bells, old paper, rags and parchments, grasses, brushwood, and even household ashes for manufacturing of potassium salts, and chestnuts for distilling. All businesses were placed at the disposal of the nation: forests, mines, quarries, furnaces, forges, tanneries, paper mills, large cloth factories and shoe making workshops. The labor of men and the value of things were subject to price controls. No one had a right to speculate at the cost of Patrie while it was in danger. Armaments caused more concern. As early as September 1793 efforts were made to create a large factory in Paris for rifles and sidearms. A special appeal was made to scientists. Monge, Vandermonde, Berthollet, Darcet, Fourcroy perfected metallurgy and manufacture of arms.

Only to the wage earners did the Maximum seem thoroughly advantageous. It increased wages by one-half in relation to 1790, and commodities by only one-third. But since the Committee did not ensure that it was respected (except for bread), they would have been duped had they not been benefiting from the favorable conditions that a great war always offers the labor force. Still Paris became calmer because the sans-culottes were gradually finding ways to subsist; the levée en masse and the formation of the revolutionary army were thinning their ranks; many now were working in arms and equipment shops or in the offices of the committees and ministries, which were expanded enormously.

Army of the Year II

During the summer the requisition of the levy was completed and by July the total strength of the army reached 650,000. The difficulties were tremendous. The war production just started in September. The army was in the middle of the purge. In the spring of 1794, the amalgamation was undertaken. Two battalions of volunteers joined one battalion of regulars to constitute a demi-brigade, or regiment. At the same time, the command was reconstituted. The purge ended with most of the nobles excluded. The new generation reached the highest ranks, and the War College (Ecole de Mars) received six young men from each district to improve the staff. Army commanders were to be appointed by the Convention.

What gradually emerged was a military command unequalled in quality. Marceau, Hoche, Kleber, Massena, Jourdan, and a host of others, backed by officers who were sound both in their abilities as soldiers and in their sense of civic responsibility. 

For the first time since antiquity a truly national army marched to war, and for the first time, too, a nation succeeded in arming and feeding great numbers of soldiers, which were the novel characteristics of the army of the Year II. The technical innovations resulted chiefly from its sheer size as well the strategy that developed from it. The old system of cordons lost its prestige. Moving between the armies of the Coalition, the French could maneuver along interior lines, deploy part of their troops along the frontiers and take advantage of the inaction of any one of their enemies to beat the others. Acting en masse, and overwhelming the foe by sheer numbers were Carnot's principles. They were still untried and not until Bonaparte appeared did they enjoy any great success.

 Fall of factions 
As late as September 1793, there were two distinct wings among the revolutionaries. Firstly, those who were later called Hébertists although Hébert himself was never the official leader of a party advocated war to the death and adopted the program of the enragés, ostensibly because the sans-culottes approved it. The Hebertists preferred to side with the Montagnards so long as they could hope to control the Convention through them. They dominated the Cordeliers Club, filled Bouchotte's offices, and could generally carry the Commune with them. The other wing was the Dantonists, which formed in response to the increasing centralization of the Revolutionary Government and the dictatorship of the Committees. The Dantonists were led predominately by deputies of the Convention (rather than the sans-culottes), including Danton, Delacroix, and Desmoulins.

Putting the needs of national defense above all other considerations, the Committee of Public Safety had no intentions of giving in to the demands of either the popular movement or the moderates.  In order to balance the contradictory demands of these two factions, the Revolutionary Government attempted to maintain a position halfway between the moderate Dantonists (citras) and the extremist Hebertists (ultras).

But at the end of the winter of 1793–4, the shortage of food took a sharp turn for the worse. The Hebertists incited sans-culottes to demand stringent measures, and at first, the Committee proved conciliatory. The Convention voted 10 million for relief, on 3 Ventose, Barère presented a new general Maximum, and on the 8th Saint-Just obtained a decree confiscating the property of suspects and distributing it to the needy (Ventôse Decrees). The Hebertists felt that if they increased the pressure, they would triumph once and for all. Although the call appeared like one for insurrection it was probably just for a new demonstration, like the one in September. Howecer, the Committee of Public Safety decided on 22 Ventôse Year II (12 March 1794) that the Hebertists posed too serious a threat. The Committee linked Hebert, Ronsin, Vincent, and Momoro to the emigres Proli, Cloots and Pereira, so as to present the Hebertists as parties to the "foreign plot". All were executed on 4 Germinal (24 March).  This move largely silenced the Hebertists, now without their leadership. Having succeeded in stifling dissent on the left, the Committee then turned on the Dantonists, several members of which were implicated in financial corruption. The Committee forced the Convention to lift the parliamentary immunity of nine Dantonist deputies, allowing them to be put on trial. On 5 April Dantonist leaders Danton, Delacroix, Desmoulins, and Philippeaux were executed.

The execution of the leaderships of both rival factions caused some to become disillusioned. Many sans-culottes were stunned by the Hebertists' execution. All positions of influence traditionally held by the sans-culottes were eliminated. The Revolutionary Army was disbanded, the inspectors of food-hoarding were dismissed, Bouchotte lost the War Office, the Cordeliers Club was forced to self-censor and the Government pressure brought about closing 39 popular societies. The Paris Commune, controlled by sans-culottes, was purged and filled with Committee nominees. With the execution of the Dantonists, many of the members of the National Convention lost trust in the Committee and even began to fear for their personal safety.

Ultimately, the Committee had undermined its own support by eliminating the Dantonists and Hebertists, both of which had backed the Committee. By compelling the Convention to allow the arrests of the Girondins and Dantonists, the Committee believed that it had destroyed its major opposition. However, the trials demonstrated the Committee's lack of respect for members of the Convention, several of whom had been executed. Many Convention members who had sided with the Committee by mid-1794 no longer supported it. The Committee had acted as mediator between the Convention and the sans-culottes from which they both had acquired their strength. By executing the Hebertists and alienating the sans-culottes, the Committee became unnecessary to the Assembly.

 Terror 

Though the Terror was organized in September 1793, it was not introduced until October. It had resulted from a popular movement. A new chapter of the Revolutionary Tribunal was opened after 5 September, divided into four sections: the Committees of Public Safety and General Security were to propose the names of judges and jurymen; Fouquier-Tinville stayed as public prosecutor, and Herman was nominated president. The Terror was meant to discourage support for the enemies of the Revolution by condemning outspoken critics of the Montagnards.

The great political trials began in October. The queen was guillotined on 16 October. A special decree stifled the defense of 21 Girondins, including Vergniaud and Brissot, and they perished on the 31st.

At the summit of the apparatus of the Terror sat the Committee of General Security, the state's second organization. It consisted of twelve members elected each month by the Convention, and vested with security, surveillance and police functions, including over civil and military authorities. It employed a large staff, headed the gradually constituted network of local revolutionary committees and applied the law on suspects by sifting through the thousands of local denunciations and arrests, which it then had to try.

It struck down the enemies of the Republic whoever and wherever they were. It was socially indiscriminate and politically perspicacious. Its victims belonged to the classes which hated the Revolution or lived in the regions where rebellion was most serious. "The severity of repressive measures in the provinces," wrote Mathiez, "was in direct proportion to danger of revolt." Many outspoken members of the community were tried and executed for claims of treason. Camille Desmoulins and Georges Danton were two of the more notable men executed for their "threats" against the Revolution.

Deputies sent as "representatives on mission" by the Committee of Public Safety, armed with full powers, reacted according to both the local situation and their own temperaments. Lindet pacified the Girondin west in July without a single death sentence. In Lyon, some months later, Collot d'Herbois and Joseph Fouche relied on frequent summary executions by shooting because the guillotine was not working swiftly enough.

 Slavery 
The monarchy made a distinction between French soil on the mainland and soil under French control such as the colonies. That distinction allowed for slavery to be illegal in France but continue in the colonies. Colonists in Saint Domingue wanted to have representation, 21 members because of their population size and contribution to the economy. That was shot down by the National Convention as the majority of their population were slaves and thus had no rights as citizens and contributed nothing to representative population. The  in France originally opposed slavery during the 1780s, but much of the opposition was ignored as a result of the French Revolution breaking out. The French showed a much greater willingness to act on the issue of slavery when the threat of a war with Spain seemed imminent. In 1792 the National Convention agreed to delegate 3 commissaries for Saint Domingue. Two of the commissaires, Léger-Félicité Sonthonax and Étienne Polverel, implemented rights for free men of color that were equal to their white counterparts. On 5 May 1793 Sonthonax and Polverel attacked the plantation system and forced the owners to treat the slaves better and care more for their well-being. Sonthonax then attacked slavery itself by freeing any slave Huzards, Latin for hazards, who had been armed by their masters since they could not return to peaceful plantation life. Polverel issued a proclamation in Cap Francais on 21 June 1793, which freed all slaves who agreed to fight for the French Republic from both internal and external threats. The commissaires then ruled that the Republic would pay an indemnity to the owners of female slaves marrying free men and that all children of that union would be free. The National Convention eventually allowed for six representative members for the colony. When pressured by the Society of the Friends of the Blacks to end the slave trade in the colonies, the National Convention refused on the grounds of slavery being too core to the French economic wealth. The committee felt "six million French people relied on the colonies to survive" and continued to stand by the argument. On 12 October 1790 the National Convention declared the only body of power who could control the status of people in the colonies were committees in the colonies themselves, which meant although free blacks met the requirement for active citizenship, the white colonists would not allow it. That was done in an attempt to please the white colonists and convince them not to join forces with the British. It also gave the colonies the power to control their own laws regarding slavery and allowed for the National Convention to wash their hands of the issue. Three deputies from Saint Domingue traveled to France to attempt to persuade the National Convention to abolish slavery. The National Convention abolished slavery after hearing speeches from the deputies on 4 February 1794. However, the Committee of Public Safety delayed sending the proclamation to the colonies for two months. That was because of the apparent opposition of Robespierre to the abolition of slavery. The issue was eventually resolved by the Committee circumventing Robespierre and ordering the abolition decree to be sent to Saint Domingue. However, Napoleon's attempt to return to slavery in 1801 removed France's state of being the first to abolish slavery and led to the loss of the most prosperous French colony.

 Thermidor 

The Jacobin dictatorship could hope to remain in power only so long as it was dealing successfully with a national emergency. As soon as its political opponents had been destroyed, and its foreign enemies defeated, it would lose the chief force that kept it together. The Jacobin fall happened more rapidly than expected because of issues within the party.

So long as it remained united, the Committee was virtually invulnerable, but it had scarcely attained the apogee of its power before signs of internal conflict appeared. The Committee of Public Safety had never been a homogeneous body. It was a coalition cabinet. Its members were kept together less by comradeship or common ideals than by calculation and routine. The press of business, which at first prevented personal quarrels, also produced tired nerves. Trifling differences were exaggerated into the issues of life and death. Small disputes estranged them from one another. Carnot, in particular, was irritated by the criticisms directed at his plans by Robespierre and Saint-Just, Dispute followed dispute. Bickering broke out on the Committee of Public Safety, with Carnot describing Robespierre and Saint-Just as "ridiculous dictators" and Collot making veiled attacks on the "Incorruptible". From the end of June to 23 July, Robespierre ceased to attend the Committee.

Realizing the danger of fragmentation, they attempted a reconciliation. Saint-Just and Couthon favored it, but Robespierre doubted sincerity of his enemies. It was he who brought about the fatal intervention of the Convention. On 8 Thermidor, Year II (26 July 1794), he denounced his opponents and demanded that "unity of government" be realized. When called upon to name those whom he was accusing, however, he refused. That failure destroyed him, for it was assumed that he was demanding a blank cheque. That night, an uneasy alliance was formed from threatened deputies and members of The Plain. On the next day, 9 Thermidor, Robespierre and his friends were not allowed to speak, and their indictment was decreed. The men of the extreme left played the leading roles: Billaud-Varenne, who attacked, and Collot d'Herbois, who presided.

On hearing the news the Paris Commune, loyal to the man who had inspired it, called for an insurrection and released the arrested deputies in the evening and mobilized two or three thousand militants. The night of 9–10 Thermidor was one of great confusion in Paris, as the Commune and the Assembly competed for the support of the sections and their troops. The Convention proclaimed that the rebels were henceforth outlaws. Barras was given the task of mustering an armed force, and the moderate sections gave their support. The National Guardsmen and artillerymen assembled outside the Hotel de Ville were left without instructions and little by little they dispersed and left the square deserted. Around two o'clock in the morning, a column from Gravilliers section led by Léonard Bourdon burst in the Hotel de Ville and arrested insurgents.

On the evening of 10 Thermidor (28 July 1794), Robespierre, Saint-Just, Couthon and nineteen of their political allies were executed without trial. The following day, it was the turn of a large batch of 71 men, the largest mass execution in the entire course of the Revolution.

 Thermidorian Convention 
Whatever reasons the conspirators had behind 9 Thermidor, the events afterwards went beyond their intentions. Evidently, the remaining members on the Committees counted on staying in office and currying the favour of the Jacobin dictatorship, as though nothing more had happened than a party purge.

 Thermidorian Reaction 

They were speedily disabused of that notion. Robespierrists might go out and Dantonists come in. The Convention had recovered its initiative and would put an end, once and for all, to the dictatorial committees government, which had ousted it from power. It was decreed that no member of governing committees should hold office for more than four months. Three days later, the Prairial Law was repealed and the Revolutionary Tribunal shorn of its abnormal powers. The Commune was replaced with a Commission of Civil Administrators (commission des administrateurs civils) from the ranks of the Conventions. In November the Jacobin club was closed. Anti-Robespierrist but anti-Jacobin reaction was in full flood. At the beginning of September Billaud, Collot and Barère left the Committee of Public Safety; by the end of the year, they were in prison.

The stability of the government was weakening. Next came the concentration of power, another revolutionary principle. The identification of the Committee of Public Safety with the executive was ended on 7 Fructidor (24 August), restricting it to its former domain of war and diplomacy. The Committee of General Security kept its control over the police. There was now to be a total of sixteen committees. Conventionnels, while aware of the dangers of fragmentation, were even more worried by its experience of monopoly of powers. In a few weeks the revolutionary government was dismantled.

The measures affected, finally, the instruments of the Terror and opened numerous breaches in the apparatus of repression. The law of 22 Prairial was repealed, the prisons were opened and "suspects" were released: 500 in Paris in a single week. A few public trials were staged, including those of Carrier, held responsible for the mass drowning at Nantes, and Fouquier-Tinville, notorious as the public prosecutor of the Great Terror of the late spring and summer of 1794, after which the Revolutionary Tribunal was quietly put aside.

The destruction of the system of revolutionary government eventually brought about the end of the 'Economic Terror'. Maximum was relaxed even before 9 Thermidor. Now virtually nobody believed in price controls any longer. Because the black market was plentifully supplied, the idea took hold that price controls equalled scarcity and that free trade, therefore, would bring back abundance. It was generally supposed by the free trade minded Physiocrat economists within France that prices would at first rise but that then they would fall as a result of competition. This illusion, however, was to be shattered in the winter of 1794–1795. Formally, the National Convention had put the end to the maximum as the season had started on the Christmas Eve of 4 Nivose Year III (24 December 1794).

That winter, the abandonment of the controlled economy provoked a frightful catastrophe. Prices soared and the rate of exchange fell. The Republic was condemned to massive inflation and its currency was ruined. In Thermidor, Year III, assignats were worth less than 3% of their face value. Neither peasants nor merchants would accept anything but cash. The debacle was so swift that economic life seemed to come to standstill.

The crisis was greatly aggravated by famine. Peasants finally stopped bringing any produce to market because they did not wish to accept assignats. The government continued to provision Paris but was unable to supply the promised rations. In provinces, local municipalities resorted to some sort of regulations with indirect coercion in obtaining provisions. The misery of rural day laborers, abandoned by everyone, was often appalling. Inflation ruined creditors to the advantage of debtors ans unleashed an unprecedented speculation.

At the beginning of spring in March–April 1795, scarcity was such that more unrest appeared almost everywhere. The city of Paris was 'active' once again.

 Crushing of the popular movement 

Discontent increased along with the shortages. On 17 March a delegation from faubourgs Saint-Marceau and Saint-Jacques complained that "We are on the verge of regretting all the sacrifices that we have made for the Revolution." Police law was passed which lay down the death penalty for use of seditious language. Arms were distributed to the "good citizens", the faithful nucleus of the National Guard. The trial of strength was approaching.

On 10 Germinal (30 March) all the sections called their general assemblies. The political geography of Paris emerged clearly from this. Convention debate was centered on two issues: the fate of Barère, Collot, Billaud and Vadier, and the implementation of the constitution of 1793. While in the sections of the center and the west formal addresses called for the punishment of the "Four" and passed over the food shortages, the sections of the east and the faubourgs demanded measures to deal with the grain crisis, the implementation of the constitution of 1793, the reopening of the popular societies and the release of the imprisoned patriots.

On the morning of 12 Germinal (1 April) crowds gathered on the Ile de la Cité and, pushing aside the palace guards, burst into the chamber where the Convention met. Amidst the uproar, spokesmen of the sections outlined the people's grievances. Reliable battalions of National Guard were called and demonstrators, lacking arms and leaders, were forced to withdraw. For the most people it was the constitution of 1793—seen as a liberating utopia—which represented the solution to all evils. There were others who openly regretted the passing of "the reign of Robespierre".

But it was not the end. A new explosion was on the horizon. Insurrection was being openly prepared. On 1 Prairial (20 May 1795) the alarm bells sounded in the faubourgs Saint-Antoine and Marceau. The armed battalions arrived at Place du Carousel and entered the sitting chamber. After an hour of uproar, "The Insurrection of the People" (L'Insurrection du Peuple) was read. In the chaos, none of the ringleaders thought of implementing the key item of the program: the overthrow of the government.

The remainder of the Montagnards, The Crest (la Crête de la Montagne), managed to obtain the passage of decrees favorable to the rebels. But at 11:30 p.m. two armed columns entered the chamber and cleared out the rioters. The next day insurgents repeated the same mistakes and after receiving promises from the deputies to take speedy measures against the famine, returned to the sections.

On 3 Prairial the government assembled loyal troops, chasseurs and dragoons, national guardsmen, selected from those "who had fortune to preserve"—20,000 men in all. Faubourg Saint-Antoine was surrounded and on 4 Prairial surrendered and was disarmed. Uncertainty about how to react, hesitancy in action, and lack of revolutionary leadership had doomed the popular movement to throw away its last chance in battle.

4 Prairial Year III is one of the crucial dates of the revolutionary period. The people had ceased to be a political force, participants in history. They were now no more than victims or spectators.

 Constitution of the Year III 

The victors now could set up a new constitution, the task the National Convention was originally elected for. The Commission of Eleven (the most notable members of which were Daunou, Lanjuinais, Boissy d'Anglas, Thibaudeau and La Révellière) drafted a text which would reflect the new balance of power. It was presented on 5 Messidor (23 June) and passed on 22 August 1795 (5 Fructidor of the Year III).

The new constitution went back to the constitution of 1791 as to the dominant ideology of the country. Equality was certainly confirmed, but within the limits of civil equality. Numerous democratic rights of the constitution 1793—the right to work, to relief, to education—were omitted. The Convention wanted to define rights and simultaneously reject both the privilege of the old order and social leveling.

The constitution went back to the distinction between active and passive citizens. Only citizens over twenty-five years old, disposing of an income of two hundred days of work, were eligible to be electors. This electoral body, which held the real power, included 30,000 people, half as many as in 1791. Later, the age limit was reduced to twenty-one. Guided by recent experience, institutions were set up to protect the Republic from two dangers: the omnipotence of an assembly and dictatorship.

Bicameral legislature as a precaution against sudden political fluctuations was proposed: the Council of Five Hundred with rights to propose laws and Council of the Ancients, 250 deputies, with powers to accept or reject proposed laws. Executive power was to be shared between five Directors chosen by the Ancients from the list drawn by Five Hundred. One of the Directors would be renewed each year with re-election after five years. As one of the practical precautions, no military were allowed within 60 miles of the sitting assembly and it could relocate in case of danger. The Directory still retained great power, including emergency powers to curb freedom of the press and freedom of association.

The Constitution generally was accepted favorably, even by those on the right, who were hopeful for the upcoming elections and even more happy to get rid of the legislative body so hated by them.

But how to make sure that the new elected body would not overturn the constitution as it was before with Legislative Assembly? Thermidorians attempted this on 5 Fructidor (22 August) by voting for a decree on "formation of a new legislative body". Article II stipulated: "All members presently active in the Convention are re-eligible. Election assemblies may not take fewer than two-thirds of them to form the legislative body". This was known as the Law of the Two-Thirds.

 Vendemiaire 

On 23 September the results were announced: the constitution was accepted by 1,057,390 votes, with 49,978 against. The Two-Thirds decrees obtained only 205,498 votes in favor and 108,754 against.

But the Convention had not taken into account those Paris sections who were against Two-Thirds decrees and failed to provide precise vote figures: 47 Parisian sections had rejected the decrees. Eighteen of the Paris sections contested the result. The Lepeletier section issued a call to insurrection. By 11 Vendemiaire seven sections were in state of revolt, sections which were the base of the Convention since 9 Thermidor and now won by the far right if not royalists. The Convention declared itself permanent. The conventionnels knew the score. They knew the art of insurrection by heart and to bring down muscadins was easier than the sans-culottes. Five members including Barras were appointed to deal with the crisis. A decree of 12 Vendemiaire (4 October) repealed the former disarmament of the former terrorists and an appeal to sans-culottes was issued.

During the nights of Vendemiaire 12–13 (October 4–5), General Jacques de Menou de Boussay was tasked with putting down the royalist rebels and keep them from attacking the Convention. He recruited other generals, such as Napoleon Bonaparte, to help aid in quelling the insurrection. The rebels outnumbered the Army by the thousands, but because of their preparations the night before, Bonaparte and the armies were able to line the road into Paris with cannons from Sablons Camp. Without a way into Paris, the rebels surrendered to the Convention on Vendemiaire 13. Barras and the Convention gave the armies permission to kill. Within 45 minutes over 300 royalist rebels were dead in front of the Church of Saint Roch. The rest had scattered and fled.

Moderate repression ensued and the White Terror in the south was stopped. On 4 Brumaire Year IV, just before breaking up, the Convention voted a general amnesty for "deeds exclusively connected with the Revolution".

 Legacy 
Anchel (1911) concludes, "The work of the Convention was immense in all branches of public affairs. By a decree of 4 February 1794 (16 pluviôse) it also ratified and expanded to the whole French colonial empire the 1793 abolition of slavery on Saint-Domingue by civil commissioners Sonthonax and Polverel, though this did not affect Martinique or Guadeloupe and was abolished by the law of 20 May 1802.

 See also 
 Fall of the French monarchy
 
 The Mountain
 
 
 
 Ministers of the French National Convention

 Notes 

 References 

 Sources 

 
 
 Andress, David, and Manuel Covo. "Race, Slavery, and Colonies in the French Revolution." In The Oxford Handbook of the French Revolution, The Oxford Handbook of the French Revolution, Chapter 017. Oxford University Press, 2015.
 
 
 
 
 
 
 
 
 
 
 Linton, Marisa, Choosing Terror: Virtue, Friendship and Authenticity in the French Revolution (Oxford University Press, 2013).
 
 
 
 Stein, Robert. "The Revolution of 1789 and the Abolition of Slavery." Canadian Journal of History/Annales Canadiennes D'Histoire 17, no. 3 (1982): 447-468.
 
 

 Further reading 
 Moitt, Bernard. Women and Slavery in the French Antilles, 1635–1848. Blacks in the Diaspora. Bloomington: Indiana University Press, 2001.
 Quinney, Valerie. "Decisions on Slavery, the Slave-Trade and Civil Rights for Negroes in the Early French Revolution." The Journal of Negro History 55, no. 2 (1970).
 Nash, Gary B. "Reverberations of Haiti in the American North: Black Saint Dominguans in Philadelphia." Pennsylvania History: A Journal of Mid-Atlantic Studies 65 (1998).
 Popkin, Jeremy D. A Short History of the French Revolution''. Sixth ed. 2015.

External links 
 Presidents of the National Convention: 1792–1795
 National Convention pamphlets and documents from the Ball State University Digital Media Repository

French First Republic
France 1792
Government of France
Provisional governments
Constituent assemblies
French Revolution
1792 establishments in France
1795 disestablishments
1792 events of the French Revolution
1793 events of the French Revolution
1794 events of the French Revolution
1795 events of the French Revolution
Historical legislatures in France